The PlayStation App is a software application for iOS and Android devices developed by PlayStation Mobile Inc. It acts as a companion app for PlayStation video game consoles, providing access to PlayStation Network community features and remote control.

Features
The application allows users to:
 See which friends are online and what they're playing.
 Receive notifications, game alerts, and invitations.
 Customize PSN profile.
 View progress and compare trophies.
 Keep up with the latest activities from friends and following players.
 Get games and add-ons at PlayStation Store, and send remote requests to PS4 to download in background.
Sony has also developed other apps to complement the main app, such as PlayStation Messages for exchanging messages with PSN users, PlayStation Communities to view PS4 communities and PS4 Second Screen, to use the device as a second screen companion on select PS4 games as well as an on-screen keyboard for quick and easy typing.

Update history
The app was first launched exclusively in European markets on January 11, 2011 and included access to PSN trophies and friends, as well as the PS Blog and information about upcoming games.

With the launch of the PS4 in North America on November 15, 2013, the app got a revamp and became available worldwide. Version 1.70 was released on April 30, 2014 adding notifications, friend request links and custom profile pictures. Version 2.00 was released on October 27, 2014 adding tablet support. Version 2.50 released on March 26, 2015 added accessibility options. Version 3.00 released on September 30, 2015 added Events and guest log in. Version 3.10 added the ability to follow verified players and the messaging portion was spun off into its own app. Version 3.50 added the ability to create events. 4.00 allowed users to change their PSN avatar right from the app. A new app, PlayStation Communities was released on November 29, 2016.

The PlayStation App was completely redesigned on November 7, 2017 with improved load times. The second screen functionality was spun off into its own app and the ability to view live broadcasts and remove trophy lists with a completion rate of 0% were removed.

The PlayStation App was completely redesigned again on October 28, 2020 with options for launching games remotely, managing storage, and signing into your system. You can purchase and download games straight to your PS5 and PS4.

While using your phone, you can create party groups and voice chat with other 15 people. PS Messages is also integrated into the PlayStation App.

Instead of the old web view, Sony has added a completely native PlayStation Store, so shopping and remotely downloading games to your PS5 and PS4 should be much easier. A updated general interface gives you a faster look at what friends are playing, as well as your own games that have recently been played.

See also
Xbox (app) 
List of PlayStation applications

References

External links
PlayStation App on the App Store
PlayStation App on Google Play Store

2013 software
IOS software
Android (operating system) software
PlayStation (brand)
PlayStation Network